El Salvador competed at the World Games 2017 in Wroclaw, Poland El Salvador didn't win any medal in the multi-sport event.

Competitors

Archery 
El Salvador had qualified one athlete for the multi-sport event.

Roberto Hernández competed in the men's compound event.

References 

Nations at the 2017 World Games
2017 in Salvadoran sport
2017